Ribes tularense is a rare species of currant known as the Sequoia gooseberry or Tulare gooseberry.

Ribes tularense is known from only about ten populations in the forests of the High Sierra Nevada. These are located in Tulare County except for one population found less than 100 meters east of the county line near Mount Whitney in Inyo County. The species is closely related to Ribes binominatum.

Ribes tularense is a low, spiny shrub rarely more than 50 cm (20 inches) tall, often trailing. It has hairy branches and hairy, toothed leaves. The flowers are greenish white and the fruits are yellow and bristly.

References

External links
Jepson Manual Treatment — Ribes tularense
Calflora Photo gallery, University of California: close-up image

tularense
Endemic flora of California
Flora of the Sierra Nevada (United States)
Plants described in 1908
Natural history of Tulare County, California